The Birthday Card Stakes is an Australian Turf Club Group 3 Thoroughbred quality handicap horse race, for fillies and mares aged three years old and upwards, over a distance of 1200 metres, held at Rosehill Racecourse in Sydney, Australia in March. Total prize money for the race is A$200,000.

History
The race is named in honour of Birthday Card, winner of the 1962 Golden Slipper Stakes.

Name
1986–1991 - Birthday Card Quality Handicap 
 1992 - Clyde Kennedy Quality
1993–1998 - Birthday Card Quality Handicap 
 1999 - Birthday Card Stakes
2000–2004 - Birthday Card Quality Handicap 
 2005 - Birthday Card Stakes
 2006 - Allied Express Stakes
2007–2008 - Cleanevent Stakes
2009 onwards - Birthday Card Stakes

Venue
1986–1996 - Canterbury
1997–1999 - Rosehill
2000–2002 - Canterbury
2003 onwards  - Rosehill

Distance
1986–1987 - 1280 metres
1987–1993 - 1100 metres
1994 onwards - 1200 metres

Grade

1986–2005 - Listed race
2006 onwards - Group 3

Winners

 2022 - Emanate
 2021 - Seasons
 2020 - Miss Exfactor
 2019 - Avantage
 2018 - Quilista
 2017 - Raiment
 2016 - Sultry Feeling
 2015 -  Shamalia
 2014 -  Avoid Lightning
 2013 -  Arinosa
 2012 -  Celts
 2011 -  Zingaling
 2010 -  Patronyme
 2009 -  Gamble Me
 2008 -  Throne Inn
 2007 -  Aunty Betty
 2006 -  Imana 
 2005 - Tui Song
 2004 - Paraca
 2003 - Toast Of The Coast
 2002 - Hot Riff
 2001 - Spinning Hill
 2000 - Verdict Declared
 1999 - Toorak
 1998 - All The Rave
 1997 - Unison
 1996 - So Keen
 1995 - Light Up The World
 1994 - Baldeen
 1993 - Miss Kariba
 1992 - River Love 
 1991 - Settlers Cove
 1990 - Deira 
 1989 - Simple Tastes 
 1988 - Mother Duck 
 1987 - Special 
 1986 - Kisim Hiat

See also
 List of Australian Group races
 Group races

References

External links 
First three placegetters Birthday Card Stakes (ATC)

Horse races in Australia